The 1998 Legg Mason Tennis Classic was a men's tennis tournament played on outdoor hard courts in Washington, D.C., United States, that was part of the International Series Gold of the 1998 ATP Tour. It was the twenty-ninth edition of the tournament and was held from July 20 through July, 26. Second-seeded Andre Agassi won the singles title.

Finals

Singles

 Andre Agassi defeated  Scott Draper, 6–2, 6–0

Doubles

 Grant Stafford /   Kevin Ullyett defeated  Wayne Ferreira /  Patrick Galbraith, 6–2, 6–4

References

External links
 ATP tournament profile

Legg Mason
Washington Open (tennis)
1998 in sports in Washington, D.C.
1998 in American tennis